This is a list of members and guests artists for the Japanese fantasy musical group Sound Horizon.

Members

Current

Timeline

References

External links 
 List of Sound Horizon members and their tenures with the band.

Sound Horizon
Sound Horizon